The following outline of information science is provided as an overview of and topical guide to information science:

Information science – interdisciplinary field primarily concerned with the analysis, collection, classification, manipulation, storage, retrieval and dissemination of information. Practitioners within the field study the application and usage of knowledge in organizations, along with the interaction between people, organizations and any existing information systems, with the aim of creating, replacing, improving or understanding information systems.

What type of thing is information science? 

Information science can be described as all of the following:

 An academic discipline –
 A branch of science –
 An applied science –
 An action research –

Sub-disciplines of information science 
 Information technology
 Informatics
 Classification
 Bibliometrics
 Preservation
 Cultural studies
 Categorization
 Data modeling
 Memory
 Computer storage
 Intellectual property
 Intellectual freedom
 Privacy
 Censorship

Contributing fields 
As an interdisciplinary field, information science draws upon and incorporates concepts and methodologies from:

 Archival science
 Cognitive science
 Commerce
 Communications
 Computer science
 Law
 Library science
 Museology
 Management
 Mathematics
 Philosophy
 Public policy
 Social sciences

History of information science 

 History of information science
 Documentation science – predecessor of information science.
 Fathers of information science
 Paul Otlet
 Henri La Fontaine
 Information history
 International Federation for Information and Documentation
 History of information representation and retrieval
 Has undergone four phases of development
 Increased Demand (1940s–early 1950s) (Information explosion)
 Rapid Growth (1950s–1980s) (the emergence of computers and systems such as Dialog (online database))
 Demystification Phase (1980s–1990s) (systems developed for end-user searching)
 The Networked Era (1990s–Present) (search engines such as AltaVista and Google)

Research methods of information science
 Archival research – facts or factual evidences from a variety of records are compiled.
 Computational complexity and structure – algorithmic and graphic methods are used to explore the complexity of information systems, retrieval and storage.
 Content analysis – studies how people communicate by analyzing the contents of books and mass media as well as the messages people talk or write about.
 Case study – specific set of circumstances or a group (the 'case') is analyzed according to a specific goal of study. Generally, case studies are used to characterize a trend or development; they have weak generalizability.
 Discourse analysis – analyzing written, oral, and sign language use
 Historical method – involves a continuous and systematic search for the information and knowledge about past events related to the life of a person, a group, society, or the world.
 Interviews – researchers obtain data by interviewing people. If the interview is non-structured, the researcher leaves it to the interviewee (also referred to as the respondent or the informant) to guide the conversation.
 Life history – study of the personal life of a person. Through a series of interviews, the researcher can probe into the decisive moments in their life or the various influences on their life.
 Longitudinal study – extensive examination of a specific group over a long period of time.
 Observation – using data from the senses, one records information about a social phenomenon or behavior. Qualitative research relies heavily on observation, although it is in a highly disciplined form.
 Participant observation – involves researchers going into the field (usually a community), living with the people for some time, and participating in their activities in order to know and feel their culture.

General information science concepts 

Academic publishing (including peer review and open access)
Bibliometrics
Data modeling
Document management and Document Engineering
Groupware
Human-computer interaction (HCI)
Information access
Information architecture
Information ethics
Information literacy
Information management
Information retrieval (IR)
Information seeking
Information seeking behavior
 Browsing
Information society
Information systems
Intellectual property (IP)
Knowledge engineering
Knowledge management
 Knowledge transfer
Knowledge organization
Memory institutions
Ontology
Personal information management (PIM)
Philosophy of information
Scholarly communication
Scientific communication
Science and technology studies
Semantic Web
Steganography
Usability engineering
 Human factors
User-centered design
 Design philosophy

Related disciplines
There are many fields which claim to be "sciences" or "disciplines" which are difficult to distinguish from each other and from information science. Some of them are:

Archival science
Communication studies
Computer science
Documentation science
Informatics
Information management
Information systems research
Information literacy
Internet studies
Knowledge management
Library science
Media studies
Records management
Scientometrics

Information science organizations 
 American Society for Information Science and Technology
 Association of Information Technology Professionals (AITP)
 Society of Information Technology Management (SOCITM), related group based in the UK

Related governmental agencies
 National Commission on Libraries and Information Science (NCLIS)
 Institute of Museum and Library Services (IMLS)

Educational institutions 
 Information school
 List of Information Schools

Information science awards 
 Claude E. Shannon Award
 IEEE Reynold B. Johnson Information Storage Systems Award
 IEEE Richard W. Hamming Medal
 J.W. Graham Medal
 O'Moore Medal

Information science publications

Information science journals 

 African Journal of Library, Archives and Information Science
 Canadian Journal of Information and Library Science
 Information Research
 Information Sciences (journal)
 Information, Communication & Society
 International Journal of Geographical Information Science
 Journal of Information Science
 Journal of Librarianship and Information Science
 Journal of the Association for Information Science and Technology
 TripleC

Persons influential in information science 
Tim Berners-Lee
John Shaw Billings
George Boole
Suzanne Briet
Michael Buckland
Vannevar Bush
Melville Dewey
Luciano Floridi
Henri La Fontaine
Eugene Garfield
Frederick Kilgour
Frederick Wilfrid Lancaster
Gottfried Leibniz
Alexander Ivanovich Mikhailov
S. R. Ranganathan
Seymour Lubetzky
Wilhelm Ostwald
Paul Otlet
Gerald Salton
Jesse Shera
Warren Weaver

See also 
 Information and Computer Science
 Information history
 Informative modelling
 International Federation for Information Processing – Global body for informatics.
 Internet search engines and libraries
Library and information science
 Chartered Institute of Library and Information Professionals

References

External links 

 Knowledge Map of Information Science
 Journal of Information Science
 Digital Library of Information Science and Technology open access archive for the Information Sciences
 Current Information Science Research at U.S. Geological Survey
 Introduction to Information Science
 The Nitecki Trilogy
 Information science at the University of California at Berkeley in the 1960s: a memoir of student days
 Chronology of Information Science and Technology
 LIBRES - Library and Information Science Research Electronic Journal - Curtin University of Technology, Perth, Western Australia

 
Information science
Information science